Doerfler is a surname. Notable people with the surname include:

Christian Doerfler (1862–1934), Justice of the Wisconsin Supreme Court 
John Francis Doerfler (born 1964), American Roman Catholic bishop
Leo Doerfler (1919–2004), American Audiologist

See also
Dörfler